Forestville is an inner southwestern suburb of Adelaide in the City of Unley. It is traversed by Brown Hill Creek and the Glenelg tram line.

Former NBL franchise and current Premier League club, the Forestville Eagles, are named after the suburb.

References

Suburbs of Adelaide